01527 is the national dialling code for Redditch in the United Kingdom. 
Before PhONEday the area code was 0527. The mnemonic for 0527 corresponds with LA 7 where LA could have been taken from the letters L and A in Lapworth, a small village in Warwickshire close to Redditch but not served by the 0527 dialling code. The original dialling code for Redditch was 0739, with the mnemonic RE 9 where RE are taken from the letters R and E in Redditch.

In common with all other British area codes the initial '0' is a trunk prefix that is not required when dialling from abroad.

Redditch is one of a small number of dialling codes which still retains 5 figure telephone numbers. 01527 60000 to 69999 are located on Redditch (Old Town) telephone exchange. They are the successors to 07392 60000 to 69999, and prior to STD the original 4 figure numbers on the manual telephone exchange which served Redditch until the early 1960s.

Coverage
The dialling code contains eight telephone exchanges which serve the towns of Redditch and Bromsgrove in Worcestershire, several villages in Worcestershire on the outskirts of these two towns, and the village of Studley in Warwickshire.  

Settlements served by the dialling code include: Astwood Bank, Bromsgrove, Catshill, Dodford, Hanbury, Lickey End, Redditch, Studley, Wychbold

History
Redditch was a dependent charge group of Birmingham during the period when its STD code was 0739 as it did not have its own Group switching centre (GSC). The routing digits for 0739 in distant STD exchanges were the same as those for Birmingham Newhall exchange followed by 194. 
Redditch telephone exchanges were not arranged in a linked numbering scheme, so 0739 was suffixed with a digit identifying the particular exchange. 

The STD codes were changed some time in the early 1970s - possibly on the date that the Headless Cross GSC came into operation, replacing Birmingham Newhall. The new STD codes were unchanged in 1984. 

Calls from the Redditch charge group were charged at local rate to telephone exchanges in the following STD codes:

Former local dialling codes
From Birmingham:

Local dialling codes were not provided for telephone exchanges with 3 figure numbers. Calls to these exchanges were via the operator then later the full STD codes was used.

From Dudley:

A direct link was provided between Dudley and Bromsgrove. Calls to other exchanges were routed via Redditch. The unpublished dialling code 94383 would also have worked for Bromsgrove in 1961 with the call routed via Redditch. 943 would also have worked for Bromsgrove 5 figure numbers in 1985 with the call routed via Redditch as the Bromsgrove exchange was now incorporated into the linked numbering scheme. 

From Kidderminster:

A direct link was provided between Kidderminster and Bromsgrove. Calls to other exchanges were routed via Redditch. The unpublished dialling codes 85283 and 94383 would also have worked for Bromsgrove in 1966 and 1967 respectively with the call routed via Redditch.

From Bewdley:

Calls to Redditch exchanges were routed via Kidderminster. 9 was the local dialling code for Kidderminster from Bewdley. By 1984 the local dialling codes for satellite exchanges had been withdrawn from the code book and the full STD codes listed instead. The local dialling codes may still have worked. 994383 and 9943 would also have worked for Bromsgrove in 1967 and 1984 respectively with the call routed via Redditch. 

From Evesham:

An undated dialling code card for Ashton-under-Hill from the late 1960s also includes local dialling codes for Headless Cross and Ipsley telephone exchanges.

From Pebworth:

Calls to Redditch were routed via Stratford-upon-Avon and Evesham. 9 was the local dialling code for Stratford-upon-Avon from Pebworth; 95 was the local dialling code for Evesham from Stratford-upon-Avon; and 96 was the local dialling code for Redditch from Evesham. The full STD codes are published for other exchanges but "chained" local dialling codes may have worked – such as 9959686 for Wychbold.

References

1527
Worcestershire
Warwickshire